Erika is a 1971 Italian drama film directed by Filippo Walter Ratti and starring Pierre Brice, Patrizia Viotti and Carla Mancini. The film grossed over 300 million lire on release, but was then banned due to alleged obscene content.

It was shot at the Elios Studios in Rome and on location around Faleria in Lazio. It was shot back-to-back with The Night of the Damned, using the same sets. The art direction was by Elio Balletti.

Synopsis
A free-spirited young German woman arrives to stay with an aristocratic family in Sicily, causing havoc to their lives.

Cast
 Pierre Brice as Renato Laurana
 Patrizia Viotti as Erika
 Giuseppe Fortis as Baron Giovanni Laurana
 Carla Mancini as Concettina
 Bernard De Vries as Luca Laurana
 Antonio Anelli as Padre Gaetano
 Franca Haas	
 Irio Fantini	
 Carla Calò

References

Bibliography 
 Curti, Roberto. Italian Gothic Horror Films, 1970-1979. McFarland, 2017.

External links 
 

1971 films
Italian thriller films
1970s thriller films
1970s Italian-language films
Films directed by Filippo Walter Ratti
Films set in Sicily
Films scored by Roberto Pregadio
1970s Italian films